The Imaginary Invalid or The Hypochondriac is a 1952 West German comedy film directed by Hans H. König and starring Joe Stöckel, Oskar Sima and Inge Egger. It is an updated adaptation of Molière's 1673 play The Imaginary Invalid.

It was made at the Bavaria Studios in Munich. The film's sets were designed by Max Mellin and Rolf Zehetbauer.

Cast
 Joe Stöckel as Daxenmeyer / Der eingebildete Kranke
 Oskar Sima as Mordius / Kurpfuscher
 Inge Egger as Ursel Daxenmeyer
 Jupp Hussels as Dr. Hartwig
 Lucie Englisch as Sophie
 Albert Florath as Bastelmann
 Franz Muxeneder as Kuno
 Gunnar Möller as Peter
 Jochen Hauer as Adolf
 Ulrich Beiger as Rolf
 Harry Halm as Polizist
 Paul Schwed as Hausierer
 Gertrud Wolle as Emma
 Maria Krahn as Frieda
 Sonja Costa as Loni
 Elise Aulinger as Bäuerin

References

Bibliography 
 Hans-Michael Bock and Tim Bergfelder. The Concise Cinegraph: An Encyclopedia of German Cinema. Berghahn Books, 2009.

External links 
 

1952 films
1952 comedy films
German comedy films
West German films
1950s German-language films
Films directed by Hans H. König
German films based on plays
Films based on works by Molière
German black-and-white films
1950s German films